Abdel Ali Slimani (Arabic عبد العلي سليماني, Algiers) is an Algerian raï singer.

Life
Jazz Times described his 1996 album Mraya "an impressive debut" being noted by others for his song Moi et Toi. Slimani's rai steers clear of suggestive content and bad language and is as Slimani says "family music" heard on the radio in Algeria even in the 1990s.

References

Living people
Year of birth missing (living people)
20th-century Algerian  male singers
21st-century Algerian  male  singers
Raï musicians
English-language singers from Algeria